Chashcha is a rural locality (a village) in Petushinskoye Rural Settlement, Petushinsky District, Vladimir Oblast, Russia. The population was three as of 2010. There are 2 streets.

Geography
Borok is the nearest rural locality.

References

Rural localities in Petushinsky District